Steve Newbury (born 21 April 1956) is a  former Welsh professional snooker player from Neath.

As an amateur, Newbury won the 1979 National Pairs Championship (with Cliff Wilson), and the 1980 Welsh Amateur Championship. At the 1980 World Amateur Snooker Championship, he was eliminated by Jimmy White in the quarter-finals.

Newbury turned professional in 1984. He was runner-up in the 1987 Welsh Professional Championship, defeated 7-9 by Doug Mountjoy; and reached the semi-finals of the 1988 Classic, losing 2–9 to Steve Davis.

He reached a high ranking of 19th in 1989/1990.

References

External links
Profile on globalsnooker.co.uk

1956 births
Living people
Welsh snooker players
Snooker players from Neath